Metalwood is a Canadian jazz band from Toronto, Ontario. the band was active in the late 1990s and early 2000s, and reunited in 2016. The members are saxophonist  Mike Murley,  pianist/trumpeter Brad Turner, bassist Chris Tarry and drummer Ian Froman.

History
Metalwood was formed in Toronto in 1997. The group signed with Brian Watson's Maximum Music Group.

The members performed together until 2003, and recorded six albums of jazz music.  Their first two albums 1997's Metalwood and Metalwood 2 in 1998, each won a Juno Award for best contemporary jazz album.

In 2016, Metalwood reunited, performing in Toronto and recording a new album, Twenty. Later that year the band went on tour to support the album, which won a Juno Award as best group jazz album of the year.

Awards and recognition
 1998: Juno Award, Best Contemporary Jazz Album, Metalwood
 1999: Juno Award, Best Contemporary Jazz Album, Metalwood 2
 2017: Juno Award, Best Jazz Album - Group Twenty

Discography
 1997: Metalwood 
 1998: Metalwood 2
 1999: Metalwood Live
 2001: Metalwood 3
 2001: Recline
 2003: Chronic
 2016: Twenty

References
Citations

External links
Mike Murley's Official Site
Chris Tarry's Official Site
Ian Froman's Official Site
Brad Turner's Official Site
"Metalwood legacy built on a solid foundation" Erin McPhee / North Shore News September 8, 2016

Musical groups established in 1997
Musical groups from Toronto
Canadian jazz ensembles
Juno Award for Contemporary Jazz Album of the Year winners
1997 establishments in Ontario
Juno Award for Jazz Album of the Year – Group winners